Houlihan Lokey, Inc., is an American multinational independent investment bank and financial services company. Houlihan Lokey was founded in 1972 and is headquartered at Constellation Place in Century City, Los Angeles, California. The firm advises large public and closely held companies as well as institutions and governments. Its main service lines include mergers and acquisitions, capital markets, restructuring and distressed M&A, fairness opinions, and financial and valuation advisory. As of January 2023, Houlihan Lokey employs more than 2,500 employees worldwide.

History

1970s
Houlihan Lokey, previously known as Houlihan Lokey Howard & Zukin, was co-founded in Los Angeles in 1972 by Richard Houlihanand O. Kit Lokey, both of whom left PricewaterhouseCoopers to start the company. Co-founders Robert "Bob" F. Howard joined the company in 1974, followed by James H. Zukin in 1976. The company started as a provider of general business advisory services to privately held companies.

The 1974 passage of the Employee Retirement Income Security Act launched the firm’s valuation business by creating demand for independent valuations of private businesses, particularly those that had formed employee stock ownership programs.

1980s
In 1986, Kenneth Friedman founded and became President of Houlihan Lokey’s investment banking broker dealer to provide M&A advisory services and to raise debt and equity financing. Friedman formed the investment bank to provide Wall Street level expertise to the expanding investment banking demands of Houlihan Lokey’s clients and other middle market companies. By 1987, many of the highly leveraged transactions completed earlier in the decade were starting to exhibit signs of financial distress. Accordingly, a market was developing for financial restructuring advisory services. To position itself to serve this market, the investment banking broker-dealer purchased Cheviot Capital Corporation in 1987 and, led by Jeff Werbalowsky and Irwin Gold, began assembling what would become an active, dominant, worldwide financial restructuring group.

With the surge of mergers, acquisitions, and leveraged buyouts, Wall Street’s large investment banking firms began calling on Houlihan Lokey for independent valuation expertise in fairness, solvency, and employee stock ownership plan (ESOP) opinions. The firm advised on transactions valued at more than $100 billion during this period. The firm also started to offer estate planning valuation services. In addition, the firm opened several offices in the 1980s in New York City, San Francisco, and Chicago.

1990s
Houlihan Lokey opened eight offices across the U.S. in the 1980s and 1990s as it expanded. In 1995, to grow its information services division, Houlihan Lokey acquired Mergerstat, a publishing company with a 30-year history in analytical M&A research, from Merrill Lynch.

2000s
In 2001, Houlihan Lokey launched its first non-U.S. office by expanding into London. It also expanded its industry group platform and private equity coverage program in keeping with investment banking trends.

In 2002, Houlihan Lokey advised the official creditors committees in three large bankruptcies: WorldCom, Enron, and Conseco.

In 2005, the firm opened a Paris office.

In 2006, the firm opened a Frankfurt office. Also in 2006, Houlihan Lokey agreed to merge with Orix USA, the U.S. corporate lending operations of ORIX Corp. of Japan, to address the growing international demand for middle-market investment banking services.

In 2007, Houlihan Lokey expanded into Asia, opening offices in Hong Kong and Tokyo. Within the next three years, the firm also opened an office in Beijing.

In 2008, Houlihan Lokey advised the creditors of Lehman Brothers.

2010s
In 2010, Houlihan Lokey bought a sizable minority stake in Avista Advisory Group, giving the firm offices in both Mumbai and Singapore.

In 2013, Houlihan Lokey expanded its Financial Institutions Group through the acquisition of Milestone Advisors. The firm also launched the Illiquid Financial Assets practice to advise on the sales of assets such as stakes in loan pools, life settlements, minority positions, pharmaceutical royalties, and operating leases.

In 2014, Houlihan Lokey acquired ArchPoint Partners.

In 2015, Houlihan Lokey acquired management consulting firm Bridge Strategy Group, digital media and entertainment focused investment bank MESA Securities, London-based consumer-focused firm McQueen Ltd., and operations of the Continental European investment bank Leonardo & Co. Also in 2015, Houlihan Lokey acquired the investment banking operations of Leonardo & Co. NV in Germany, the Netherlands, and Spain, and became a minority partner in a joint venture with the management team of Leonardo in respect to Leonardo’s investment banking operations in Italy. This gave the firm offices in both Rome and Milan. On August 13, 2015, Houlihan Lokey completed its initial public offering, beginning trading as HLI on the NYSE.

In January 2017, Houlihan Lokey acquired Black Stone IP, a leader in Tech+IP advisory work.

In January 2018, Houlihan Lokey acquired Quayle Munro Limited, an independent advisory firm focused on providing corporate finance advisory services to companies in the data & analytics sector. In May 2018, the firm acquired BearTooth Advisors, an independent advisory firm that provided strategic advisory and placement agency services to alternative investment managers.

In October 2019, Houlihan Lokey acquired Freeman & Co., an independent advisory firm providing a range of advisory services to financial institution clients. This was followed shortly after by the acquisition of Fidentiis Capital in November 2019, growing Houlihan Lokey's Corporate Finance business in Europe.

2020s
In June 2020, Houlihan Lokey acquired MVP Capital, an independent advisory firm providing a range of advisory services to clients in the TMT sector.

In July 2021, Houlihan Lokey expanded its coverage of the consumer sector with the acquisition of boutique advisory firm Baylor Klein. Later, in October 2021, Houlihan Lokey acquired GCA Corporation, a top technology advisory firm, expanding the firm's presence in Asia and Europe. 

In November 2022, Houlihan Lokey acquired Oakley Advisory, an independent advisory firm providing a range of services to clients across the digital infrastructure, communications services, and cloud landscape.

Industries 
Houlihan Lokey's industry coverage groups include Business Services; Consumer, Food, and Retail; Energy; Financial Services; Healthcare; Industrials; Real Estate, Lodging, and Leisure; and Technology.

Recognition 
As of 2022, Houlihan Lokey is the top investment bank for global M&A transactions under $1 billion, the top M&A advisor for the past eight consecutive years in the U.S., the top global restructuring advisor for the past nine consecutive years, the top global M&A fairness opinion advisor over the past 25 years, and a Top 10 Most Active Global M&A Advisor as measured by Refinitiv.

Office locations

  Amsterdam
  Atlanta
  Beijing
  Boston
  Chicago
  Dallas
  Dubai
  Frankfurt
  Fukuoka
  Gurugram
 Ho Chi Minh City
 Hong Kong
  Houston
  London
  Los Angeles
  Madrid
  Manchester
 Miami
  Milan
  Minneapolis
  Mumbai
 Munich
 Nagoya
 New York City
  Osaka
 Paris
  San Francisco
  Shanghai
 Singapore
  Stockholm
 Sydney
  Tel Aviv
 Tokyo
  Washington, D.C.
 Zurich

See also

 List of investment banks
 Boutique investment bank

Notes and references

External links 
 

Bankruptcy in the United States
Companies based in Los Angeles
Investment companies of the United States
American companies established in 1972
Financial services companies established in 1972
Banks established in 1972
Investment banks in the United States
Companies listed on the New York Stock Exchange
2015 initial public offerings
1972 establishments in California